The women's single sculls competition at the 2016 Summer Olympics in Rio de Janeiro was held on 6–13 August at the Lagoon Rodrigo de Freitas.

Results

Heats
First three of each heat qualify to the quarterfinals, remainder goes to the repechage.

Heat 1

Heat 2

Heat 3

Heat 4

Heat 5

Heat 6

Repechage
First two qualify to the quarterfinals.

Repechage 1

Repechage 2

Repechage 3

Quarterfinals

Quarterfinals 1
9 August, 08:10

Quarterfinals 2
9 August, 08:20

Quarterfinals 3
9 August, 08:30

Quarterfinals 4
9 August, 08:40

Notes:
R: Repechage
Q: Quarterfinals
S: Semifinals

Semifinals A/B
First three of each heat qualify to the final A.

Semifinals A/B 1

Semifinals A/B 2

Semifinals C/D
First three of each heat qualify to the final C.

Semifinals C/D 1

Semifinals C/D 2

Semifinals E/F
First three qualify to Final E, remainder to Final F.

Semifinals E/F 1

Semifinals E/F 2

Finals

Final F

Final E

Final D

Final C

Final B

Final A

References

Women's single sculls
Women's events at the 2016 Summer Olympics